Chris Nichols is an American columnist, editor, preservationist, and author. He has written the "Ask Chris" column as an Associate Editor of LA Magazine since 2000.

Career 
Nichols, a former Chairman of the Los Angeles Modern Committee of the Los Angeles Conservancy, works to preserve the mid century modern architecture of Los Angeles. He began writing the "Ask Chris" column for Los Angeles Magazine in 2000. In "Ask Chris", Nichols answers readers' questions about Los Angeles area history and people.

Nichols is the author of The Leisure Architecture of Wayne McAllister, a book largely about historic neon signage and mid-century structures in Las Vegas and other cities. This book received positive reviews, including from Publishers Weekly, and it won a 2008 Independent Publisher Bronze Medal award. In 2018, Taschen published Walt Disney's Disneyland a definitive book on the creation of Disneyland written by Chris Nichols and co-authored by his wife, Charlene Nichols.

References 

American columnists
Writers from Los Angeles
21st-century American writers
21st-century American journalists
Journalists from California
American architecture writers